The Waubakee Formation (also referred to as the Waubakee Limestone or Waubakee Dolostone) is a unit of marine sedimentary rock found in eastern North America. Named for distinctive outcrops along the banks of the Milwaukee River near the village of Waubeka, Wisconsin, in the United States. The unit is composed primarily of fine-grained dolomicrite that is finely laminated and conspicuously unfossiliferous. Owing to the lack of useful index fossils, its age is not well constrained, though most scientists consider it the youngest Silurian stratigraphic unit in Wisconsin.

References

Geologic formations of Wisconsin
Silurian System of North America